Micrulia tenuilinea is a moth in the family Geometridae. It is found in the Indo-Australian tropics, including Sri Lanka, India (Assam), Singapore, Queensland, Rotuma, as well as on Norfolk Island, Fiji and Samoa.

References

Moths described in 1896
Eupitheciini